Armando Parente (born 29 March 1989) is a Portuguese racing driver. He won the 2008 ADAC Formel Masters season.
Currently, he races in the Portuguese Championship of Sport Prototypes, teaming with Francisco Abreu, driving a Tattus PY 012 of Team Nova Driver.

Career
At 9 years of age he began go-kart racing and performed well winning the Portugal Cup (2001, 2004 e 2006), the Portugal Open (2001 e 2002), the Portuguese Champion (2002 e 2004), and the Italian Open (2005).

In 2008 he moved to formulas and was crowned as Champion of the ADAC Formel Masters in Germany.[2] He was also a rookie driver in A1GP, testing in Sepang, Malaysia (2008) and Algarve, Portugal (2009).

In 2011 he returned to go-kart and won the Portugal Championship in X30 Shifter category. In 2012 he renewed his title of Portuguese Champion and he was also the winner of the Portugal Cup.

After not racing for a year, he won again in 2013 the Portugal Cup in X30 Shifter category.

In 2014 he debuted at the National Championship of Sport Prototypes and won in the C3 category, teaming with Rafael Lobato, driving a Radical SR3 from Parkalgar Racing Team. At the same time he participated in the Formula Acceleration 1 Championship (FA1) in Portimão, Navarra and Nurburgring.

In 2015 he won the National Sport Prototype Championship, this time in the main category, teaming with Francisco Abreu at the wheel of a Tattus PY 012 from Novadriver Team.

After a 3-year break, Armando Parente returned to the competition at the Portugal Touring Championship (TCR Series), in 2018, driving a Volkswagen Golf GTI TCR from Novadriver Team, becoming vice champion.

Racing record
 1999 - 7º Portuguese Championship - Karting Cadet
 2000 - 3º Portuguese Championship - Karting Juvenile
 2001 - Winner of Portugal K Open - Karting Juvenile
 2001 - Vice Portuguese Champion - Karting Juvenile
 2001 - Winner of Portugal Cup - Karting Juvenile
 2002 - Winner of Portugal K Open - Karting Junior
 2002 - Portuguese Champion - Karting Junior
 2003 - 9º European Championship - Karting Junior
 2004 - Portuguese Champion - Karting ICA
 2004 - Winner of Portugal Cup - Karting ICA
 2005 - Winner of Italian Open - Karting ICA
 2006 - Portuguese Driver in World Championship - Karting ICC
 2006 - Winner of Portugal Cup - Karting ICC
 2007 - 4º Position in WSK - Karting KZ2
 2007 - 9º European Championship - Karting KZ1
 2007 - 14º Position in World Cup - Karting KZ2
 2008 - ADAC Formel Masters Champion - Germany
 2011 - Portuguese Champion - Karting X30 Shifter
 2012 - Portuguese Champion - Karting X30 Shifter
 2012 - Winner of Portugal Cup - Karting X30 Shifter
 2013 - Winner of Portugal Cup - Karting X30 Shifter
 2014 - Portuguese Champion of Sport Prototypes - C3 Category
 2015 - Portuguese Champion of Sport Prototypes - CN Category
 2018 - Vice Portuguese Champion of Touring Car - TCR Series

References

External links
 Official website
 Career statistics from Driver Database

1989 births
Living people
Portuguese racing drivers
Sportspeople from Lisbon
A1 Grand Prix Rookie drivers
ADAC Formel Masters drivers
TCR International Series drivers

Campos Racing drivers